The 1983 Volta a Catalunya was the 63rd edition of the Volta a Catalunya cycle race and was held from 7 September to 14 September 1983. The race started in Salou and finished at Igualada. The race was won by José Recio of the Kelme team.

General classification

References

1983
Volta
1983 in Spanish road cycling
September 1983 sports events in Europe